In mathematics, trigonometric substitution is the replacement of trigonometric functions for other expressions. In calculus, trigonometric substitution is a technique for evaluating integrals. Moreover, one may use the trigonometric identities to simplify certain integrals containing radical expressions. Like other methods of integration by substitution, when evaluating a definite integral, it may be simpler to completely deduce the antiderivative before applying the boundaries of integration.

Case I: Integrands containing a2 − x2
Let , and use the identity .

Examples of Case I

Example 1
In the integral

we may use

Then,

For a definite integral, one must figure out how the bounds of integration change. Then,

Some care is needed when picking the bounds.

Alternatively, fully evaluate the indefinite integrals before applying the boundary conditions. In that case, the antiderivative gives

 as before.

Example 2
The integral

may be evaluated by letting 

Then,

For a definite integral, the bounds change once the substitution is performed and are determined using the equation , with values in the range . Alternatively, apply the boundary terms directly to the formula for the antiderivative.

For example, the definite integral

may be evaluated by substituting , with the bounds determined using .

On the other hand, direct application of the boundary terms to the previously obtained formula for the antiderivative yields

as before.

Case II: Integrands containing a2 + x2
Let , and use the identity .

Examples of Case II

Example 1
In the integral

we may write

so that the integral becomes

provided .

For a definite integral, the bounds change once the substitution is performed and are determined using the equation , with values in the range . Alternatively, apply the boundary terms directly to the formula for the antiderivative.

For example, the definite integral

may be evaluated by substituting , with the bounds determined using .

Meanwhile, direct application of the boundary terms to the formula for the antiderivative yields

same as before.

Example 2
The integral

may be evaluated by letting 

Then,

The integral of secant cubed may be evaluated using integration by parts. As a result,

Case III: Integrands containing x2 − a2
Let , and use the identity

Examples of Case III

Integrals like

can also be evaluated by partial fractions rather than trigonometric substitutions. However, the integral

cannot.  In this case, an appropriate substitution is:

Then,

As a result,

When , which happens when  given the range of arcsecant, meaning  instead in that case.

Substitutions that eliminate trigonometric functions
Substitution can be used to remove trigonometric functions.

For instance,

The last substitution is known as the Weierstrass substitution, which makes use of tangent half-angle formulas.

For example,

Hyperbolic substitution
Substitutions of hyperbolic functions can also be used to simplify integrals.

In the integral , make the substitution , 

Then, using the identities  and

See also

 Integration by substitution
 Weierstrass substitution
 Euler substitution

References

Integral calculus
Trigonometry